The 1986 National Professional Soccer League  of South Africa was divided into divisions known as streams.

Streams

"A" Stream

"B" Stream

References 

1986
1986 in South African sport
1986–87 in African association football leagues